"Michael" Choi Koon Ming (born 25 June 1968) （：蔡冠明）is a Hong Kong racing driver and businessman currently competing in the TCR Asia Series. Having previously competed in the Asian Touring Car Series, Clio Cup China Series and Asian Formula Renault Series amongst others.

Racing career
Choi began his career in 2004 in the Asian Formula Renault Series, he finished 5th in standings in 2012. From 2010-14 he raced in the GT Asia Series, Clio Cup China Series, Porsche Carrera Cup Asia and Asian Touring Car Series. He also raced in the Lamborghini Super Trofeo World Final in 2014.

In August 2015 it was announced that he would race in the first ever TCR Asia Series round in Sepang, driving a Honda Civic TCR for Prince Racing. On 30 November 2015, Michael Choi was crowned the first champion of the TCR Asia series after the final rounds in Macau.

Businessman
Michael Choi is Chief Executive Officer and Deputy Chairman of Sunwah International. As well, he is Chief Executive Officer of Sunwah Kingsway Capital, a role he has held since 2010. He joined the Group in 1995.

Racing record

Complete TCR International Series results
(key) (Races in bold indicate pole position) (Races in italics indicate fastest lap)

References

External links
 

1968 births
Living people
Asian Formula Renault Challenge drivers
Asian Touring Car Championship drivers
TCR Asia Series drivers
TCR International Series drivers
Hong Kong racing drivers
Asia Racing Team drivers
Ferrari Challenge drivers